Vesnarinone (INN) is a cardiotonic agent.
A mixed phosphodiesterase 3 inhibitor and ion-channel modifier that has modest, dose-dependent, positive inotropic activity, but minimal negative chronotropic activity. Vesnarinone improves ventricular performance most in patients with the worst degree of heart failure.

References

External links 

N-benzoylpiperazines
Inotropic agents
PDE3 inhibitors
Catechol ethers
Phenylpiperazines
2-Quinolones